The 7th Illinois Infantry Regiment was an infantry regiment that served in the Union Army during the American Civil War.

Service

3 month enlistments
The regiment was created in response to Battle of Fort Sumter and President Abraham Lincoln's call for 75,000 volunteers to serve for 3 months (the longest time allowed by the Constitution without Congressional approval). At the very beginning of the war the only place for Illinoisans to enlist was the state capital at Springfield. Because of this the majority of recruits were from Sangamon County. This included several militia companies that were already uniformed and partially trained; notably the "Springfield Grays" which made up Company I. The recruits were organized at Camp Yates on the outskirts of Springfield and mustered into Federal service by Captain John Pope on April 25th, 1861 for 90-days service. Camp Yates was located at the old Illinois State Fairgrounds site (currently the site of Dubois Elementary School). Throughout their training the men lived in the state fair's stables, which provided considerable comfort and relief from the elements. Despite being the first troops raised in Illinois, the regiment was numbered the 7th Illinois, paying homage to the six Illinois infantry volunteer regiments that were raised to fight in the Mexican–American War fourteen years earlier. During their service part of the regiment wore gray zouave uniforms with orange piping.

Departing Camp Yates in May 1861, they went on duty at Alton, Cairo, and Mound City, Illinois and then at St. Louis, Missouri until July, 1861. Companies "E" and "G" formed part of an expedition from Cairo to the Little River in Missouri on June 22 and 23.

3 year enlistments
The original regiment was mustered out on July 25, 1861 at Cairo; some of the soldiers re-enlisted for 3 years, but most returned home and the new 7th Illinois barely resembled the original regiment. With 3-year enlistees, the regiment saw service at the Battle of Fort Donelson, the Battle of Shiloh, the Battle of Allatoona, the March to the Sea and the Carolinas Campaign.

The regiment mustered out of service on July 9, 1865.

Total strength and casualties
The regiment suffered 8 officers and 81 enlisted men who were killed in action or who died of their wounds and 3 officers and 174 enlisted men who died of disease, for a total of 266 fatalities.

Commanders
Colonel John Pope Cook - Promoted to brigadier general March 21, 1862.
Colonel Andrew J. Babcock - resigned February 1865.
Colonel Richard Rowett - mustered out with regiment

See also

List of Illinois Civil War Units
Illinois in the American Civil War

References

Bibliography 
 Dyer, Frederick H. (1959). A Compendium of the War of the Rebellion. New York and London. Thomas Yoseloff, Publisher. .
 Ambrose, D. Leib (1868). "History of the Seventh Regiment, Illinois Volunteer Infantry, From its First Muster into the U.S. Service, April 25, 1861, to its Final Muster out, July 9th, 1865." Springfield, IL. Illinois Journal Company.

External links
The Civil War Archive

Units and formations of the Union Army from Illinois
1861 establishments in Illinois
Military units and formations established in 1861
Military units and formations disestablished in 1865